Greater Noida is a planned city located in Gautam Buddha Nagar district of the Indian state of Uttar Pradesh. The city was created as an extension to Noida area under the UP Industrial Area Development Act, 1976. The city is administered by Greater Noida Industrial Development Authority (GNIDA).

History
In the early 1980s, the Government of India realised that the rapid rate at which Delhi was expanding would result in chaos. Hence, they planned to develop residential and industrial areas around the capital to reduce the demographic burden. Before Greater Noida City, two areas had been developed—Gurgaon, across the border from Haryana, and Noida, across the border with Uttar Pradesh. 

Greater Noida Notified Area – 38000 Ha (380 km2) comprising 124 villages. Noida's infrastructure was carefully laid out, but the 1990s saw huge growth in the Indian economy. Migration to cities like Delhi, Mumbai, Kolkata, Chennai, Hyderabad and Bangalore exceeded planning estimates. Noida was developed to accommodate population growth for 20–25 years. The massive population influx from Delhi, however, caused it to overload in a mere 15 years, although intake is not complete and illegal mining remains a problem.

The government of Uttar Pradesh decided to develop another city as an extension to Noida with better planning. The idea was to create a world-class town approximately 25 kilometers from Noida. A railway station near Boraki and an international airport were included later in the plan intending to develop Greater Noida as an independent city.

During the 1990s, the Noida extension (now a part of Gautam Buddh Nagar) became what is today known as Greater Noida. The Greater NOIDA Authority manages the development of the city. Greater Noida is connected to Agra by the six-lane Yamuna Expressway. The annual Indian Grand Prix is held at the Buddh International Circuit. Roads are wide with service lanes for every major road. The sectors are named by letters of the Greek alphabet. All cabling and utilities have been built underground. Alpha, Beta, and Gamma are the oldest sectors. The other emerging sectors include Xi, Delta, Mu, Omicron and Tau. The present GNIDA office is in Gamma  II sector just opposite the historical village Rampur Jagir/Jahangir where the revolutionary Pandit Ram Prasad Bismil lived in 1919 when he was hidden underground after the Mainpuri conspiracy. A park has been named "Amar Shaheed Pt. Ram Prasad Bismil Udyan" by the Uttar Pradesh Government.

The 12th, 13th, 14th and 15th Auto Expos (The Motor Show) were held at India Expo Mart, Greater Noida, in February 2014, 2016 and 2018, 2020 respectively. In 2018, Gamma 2 was officially declared as the capital of Greater Noida.

Greater Noida West or Noida extension (GreNo West) 
Greater Noida West, previously known as Noida extension is a part of Greater Noida and it is a sub city within GB Nagar district of UP near to National Capital Territory of Delhi and part of National Capital Region (NCR) Metropolitan area.
Initially, developers had coined ”Noida Extension” to differentiate it from both Noida and Greater Noida and was given its name due to being located adjacent to Noida, The Greater Noida Authority declared that the area would now be referred to Greater Noida West.  
Greater Noida West Spread over nearly 3,635 hectares is around 4-5 km from Sector 121 Noida are a part of the Greater Noida Authority (GNIDA). The road from Sector 121 that crosses Hindon river reaches Sectors 1,2,3,4, 16B, 16C,10, 12, Techzone, Knowledge Park 5, etc in Greater Noida West and consists of 16 villages: Khairpur Gurjar, Shahberi, Devla, Patwari, Ghanghola, Bisrakh, Roza-Yakubpur, Haibatpur, Itaida, Patwari, Aminabad, Asadallapur, Maincha and Chipyana Buzurg. 

This city is home for 1.6 Lakh families living in mostly Highrise buildings and becoming an educational and shopping Hub, with highest number of schools and shopping malls. Thousands of people travelled to work in Delhi and Gurgaon on the partially completed road, waiting for FNG expressway to complete by 2022. Also Noida Metro’s construction in GreNo West is started and will be completed soon.
Also, Greater Noida West (Noida extension) did not have any PIN Codes assigned by Postal Department yet, as of November 2018.

Demographics
As per the provisional data of the 2011 census, Greater Noida had a population of 107,676, with 58,662 males and 49,014 females. The literacy rate was 86.54%, 91.48% of males and 80.65% of females.

Administration

Authority 
The city's infrastructure is looked after by the Greater Noida Industrial Development Authority, a statutory authority set-up under Uttar Pradesh Industrial Area Development Act, 1976. Authority's head is its chairman, who is an IAS officer, the authority's daily matters however, are looked after by its CEO, who is also an IAS officer. Greater NOIDA Authority comes under the Infrastructure and Industrial Development Department of Uttar Pradesh Government. As of September 2019, the Chairman  is Alok Tandon, whereas the CEO is Narendra Bhooshan.

District administration 
The Guatam Budh Nagar district is a part of Meerut division, headed by the Divisional Commissioner, who is an IAS officer of high seniority, the Commissioner is the head of local government institutions (including Municipal Corporations) in the division, is in-charge of infrastructure development in his division, and is also responsible for maintaining law and order in the division. The District Magistrate, hence, reports to the Divisional Commissioner of Meerut. The current Commissioner is Anita Meshram.

Gautam Budh Nagar district administration is headed by the District Magistrate of Gautam Budh Nagar, who is an IAS officer. The DM is in charge of property records and revenue collection for the central government and oversee the national elections held in the city. The DM was also responsible for maintaining law and order in the city prior to Police Commissionerate,  hence now police commissioner is only responsible for law and order of Gautam Budh Nagar. The District Magistrate is assisted by one Chief Development Officer, three Additional District Magistrates (Executive, Finance/Revenue and Land Acquisition) and one City Magistrate. The district has divided into three Tehsils named Sadar, Dadri and Jewar each headed by a Sub-Divisional Magistrate who reports to the District Magistrate. The current DM is Mr Suhas Lalinakere Yathiraj (IAS).

Noida Police Commissionerate 
Noida Police Commissionerate or Gautam Buddha Nagar Police Commissionerate
On 14 January 2020, the Government of Uttar Pradesh declared Gautam Buddha Nagar district as a Police Commissionerate (along with the Lucknow district). These two Commissionerate’s were the first to be created in the state of Uttar Pradesh.    
The Gautam Buddha Nagar Police Commissionerate is headed by an Commissioner of Police, who is an Additional Director General (ADG) rank official, assisted by two Additional Commissioners of Police (Addl CP) — one each for law and order, and crime and headquarters — who are of Deputy Inspector General (DIG) rank. Its first and current Police Commissioner is Alok Singh, a 1995-batch IPS officer (RR).These top three officials are reported by seven Deputy Commissioners (DCP) of the SP rank, nine additional deputy commissioner of police (Addl DCP) and 17 assistant commissioners of police (ACP) of the deputy SP rank.
The district is divided into three police zones – Noida, Central Noida and Greater Noida - consisting of 29 police stations. Zone One is Noida, comprising 10 stations of Sector 20, Sector 24, Sector 39, Sector 58, Sector 49, Expressway and Women's police station. Zone Two, Central Noida, comprising parts of Noida, Greater Noida, and Greater Noida West, has nine stations – Phase 2, Phase 3, Bisrakh, Ecotech 3, Surajpur and Badalpur. Zone Three, Greater Noida, has nine police stations — Sector Beta 2, Knowledge Park, Site V, Dadri, Jarcha, Dankaur, Rabupura, Ecotech 1 and Jewar.
As of 14 January 2020, Gautam Buddha Nagar had 3,869 police personnel — 42 inspectors, 459 sub-inspectors, 972 head constables and 2,396 constables.

Climate
Greater Noida has a similar climate to Delhi: very hot and dry during summer, hot and humid during monsoons, pleasant and dry during spring and autumn, and cool to cold during winters.

According to the Bureau of Indian Standards, the town falls under seismic zone-III, on a scale of I to V (in order of increasing proneness to earthquakes). At the same time, the wind and cyclone zoning is a "very high damage risk", according to the UNDP report. Greater Noida has a Tropical Savanna Climate with three main seasons: summer, monsoon and winter. Aside from monsoon weather, it mainly remains dry.

In summer, i.e. from March to June, the temperature ranges from a maximum of 45 °C (i.e. 113 °F) to a minimum of 23 °C (73 °F). Monsoon season prevails during mid-June to mid-September with an average rainfall of 93.2  cm (36.7 inches). The cold waves from the Himalayan region make the winters in Greater Noida very chilly. Temperatures fall to as low as 3 to 4 °C at the peak of winter. In January, a dense fog envelopes the city, reducing visibility on the streets.

Educational Institutions

Schools

 Fr. Agnel School
 Delhi Public School, Greater Noida
 Greater Valley School, Greater Noida
 Ryan International School
 Somerville School, Greater Noida
 St. Joseph's School, Greater Noida

Universities

 Amity University Greater Noida campus
 Bennett University 
 Galgotias University
 Gautam Buddha University
 Noida International University
 Sharda University
 Shiv Nadar University

Colleges and institutes

 Accurate Institute of Management and Technology
 Army Institute of Management and Technology, Greater Noida
 Galgotias College of Engineering and Technology
 Gautam Buddha University
 ITS Dental College
 Lloyd Law College
 Pandit Deendayal Upadhyaya Institute of Archaeology

Sports
Located on Yamuna Expressway, Jaypee Sports City is a planned city aimed for sports, complete with various sports venues like an international standard cricket stadium, a hockey stadium, and an international Formula 1 racing circuit.

On 30 October 2011, Greater Noida hosted the inaugural Formula One Indian Grand Prix at the Buddh International Circuit constructed by Jaypee Group. It was the seventeenth round of the 2011 Formula One season, and the first Formula One Grand Prix to take place on the Indian subcontinent and even the circuit is the first of its kind in South Asia. The second and third Formula One Indian Grands Prix were held in October 2012 and 2013, and Red Bull won.

Greater Noida Cricket Stadium, also known as "Shaheed Vijay Singh Pathik Stadium," is located near Jaypee Green Golf Course. The stadium hosted its first Ranji Trophy match between Uttar Pradesh and Baroda from 1–4 December 2015. The ground would now be used by the national cricket team of Afghanistan as its home ground.

National badminton coach Pullela Gopichand has opened a badminton academy in Greater Noida Stadium.

Jaypee Greens Golf Course, an 18-hole, par-72 course designed by Greg Norman, is situated in Greater Noida. The course opened in June 2000 and received a "Tourism Friendly Golf Course" award from India's Ministry of Tourism in 2011. It is the longest course in India.

There will also be a hockey stadium which is under construction and has a sports training academy and infrastructure for other sports.

The Time Trial cycling event for the 2010 Commonwealth Games was held at Noida–Greater Noida Expressway. Greater Noida Sports Complex Ground is also the Home Ground of Afghanistan Cricket Team.

Industries
Of late, Greater Noida has attracted a lot of interest from major corporate houses for setting up their businesses in the city. In November 2016, Patanjali Ayurved announced that it would be investing Rs. 20 billion in a greenfield investment in Greater Noida. The project has been approved by Uttar Pradesh Cabinet. A clutch of mobile manufacturers have also shown interest in investing in Greater Noida. Taiwan Electrical and Electronics Manufacturers' Association will develop a 210-acre greenfield electronic manufacturing cluster in Greater Noida with an investment of US$200 million.
India’s auto industry is postponing the Auto Expo – The Motor Show 2022 in view of the Covid-19 pandemic and the uncertainty ahead, auto industry body Society of Indian Automobile Manufacturers (Siam) said in a statement. Scheduled to be held from 2 – 9 February 2022 at India Expo Mart in Greater Noida, the show is being postponed keeping in mind the safety of exhibitors, visitors, and all stakeholders involved.

Metro Connectivity
The Noida Metro Rail Corporation (NMRC) launched metro connectivity in Greater Noida on 25 January 2019.
This project was announced in 2013. The metro runs primarily across the Noida-Greater Noida Expressway.

Notable people
 

Arjun Bhati, Indian teenage golfer
Varun Singh Bhati, para high jumper

References

External links

 

High-technology business districts in India
Cities and towns in Gautam Buddh Nagar district
Planned cities in India
Cities in Uttar Pradesh
1997 establishments in India
Satellite cities
Rm non-extant category